The Supreme Revolutionary Committee, sometimes referred to as the Revolutionary Council or the Revolutionary Committee, is an interim body in Yemen formed by the Zaidiyyah Shia group Ansar Allah (more commonly known as the Houthis). In their 6 February 2015 "constitutional declaration" after seizing control of the Yemeni capital and much of former North Yemen, and the failure of Thursday talks between the Houthis and Yemen’s many political parties that were aimed at forming a government to replace Hadi and his cabinet, the group declared the committee would act as Yemen's interim authority. The committee was given the task of forming a new 551-seat parliament, which would then select a five-member presidential council to rule the country for two years.

The president of the committee was Mohammed Ali al-Houthi.

On 15 August 2016, the Supreme Revolutionary Committee partially handed power to the Supreme Political Council.

International reactions
The legitimacy of the committee was rejected by a number of Yemeni opposition groups, including the Houthis' Sunni rivals in the Islah Party and the separatist Southern Movement, as well as the United Nations, United States, and Gulf Cooperation Council.

References

Houthis
Politics of Yemen
Yemeni Crisis (2011–present)